Fading American Dream is the third album by Street Dogs. It was released on October 24, 2006 by Brass Tacks Records, a division of DRT Entertainment.

The album was released both with and without a bonus DVD.

Track listing
All songs by Street Dogs (Mike McColgan,  Johnny Rioux, Marcus Hollar, Joe Sirois and Tobe Bean) unless otherwise noted.
 "Common People" – 4:07
 "Not Without a Purpose" – 3:15
 "Fatty" (Paul Delano) – 3:17
 "Decency Police" – 2:26
 "There Is Power in a Union" (Billy Bragg cover) – 3:36
 "Tobe's Got a Drinking Problem" – 3:40
 "Shards of Life" – 2:47
 "Sell Your Lies" – 2:07
 "Rights to Your Soul" – 3:28
 "Hard Luck Kid" – 3:48
 "Fading American Dream" – 2:54
 "Final Transmission" – 4:20
 "Katie Bar the Door" – 3:03

Credits
Mike McColgan – vocals
Johnny Rioux – bass, backing vocals, mandolin, harmonica, acoustic guitar
Marcus Hollar – lead guitar, backing vocals, dobro, pump organ, acoustic guitar
Tobe Bean - rhythm guitar, slide guitar, dobro
Joe Sirois – drums
James Fearnley – tin whistle on "Shards of Life"
Matt Hensley – accordion on "Shards of Life"
Ted Hutt – E bow guitar on "Shards of Life", slide guitar on "Final Transmission", acoustic guitar on "Katie Bar the Door", backing vocals
Joe Gittleman – backing vocals
Leonard Sanford – backing vocals
Donald McColgan – backing vocals

Street Dogs albums
2006 albums
Brass Tacks Records albums